Athangaraividuthi is a village in the Gandaravakottai revenue block of Pudukkottai district, Tamil Nadu, India.

Demographics 
As per the 2001 census, Athangaraividuthi had a total population of 2071 with 1071 males and 1000 females. Out of the total population 1054 people were literate.

References

Villages in Pudukkottai district